The Boca do Vento Elevator, is a Portuguese elevator in civil parish of Almada, Cova da Piedade, Pragal e Cacilhas, in the municipality of Almada, in the district of Setúbal.

History
Construction of the elevator began in 1999 and took about a year. It was inaugurated in 2000.

Architecture

The elevator is situated in the urban area along the south margin of Tagus River, along the cliffs and arriba, oriented to the north, with a view of the city of Lisbon along Almada Velha. Its riverfront base fronts the old city along the wharf and river, in a garden that connects to important points along the river bank, including Fonte da Pipa (Pipa Spring), Museu Náutico e Arqueológico (Nautical Archaeological Museum), Cais da Câmara (used by the city's water-taxis) and the old warehouses.

The Jardim do Rio (River Garden) was authored by architects Helena Moreira and Anabela Felício, marked by a principal access that begins at Fonte da Pipa and established an integrated connection to the elevator. The isolated elevator/overlook occupies a concrete platform, in hydraulic mosaics, in blue and white azulejo. A few blocks that fell from the cliffs are part of the group, and includes Portuguese pavement stone that form circular spaces, where exotic species of plants are planted.

The lift is supported by electric traction motor, using a VVVF regulated-mechanism, supported by a robust metal frame. The concrete lift includes a communication system between ticketbooth and machine rooms, in addition to vertical chamber, constructed of reinforced concrete, semi-open with four emergency accesses (in addition to the principal accesses). It includes a copper roof with a "sandwiched" crawler panel and lacquered polyurethane, allowing light through translucent, honeycombed polycarbonate sheet, that faces the bank. The emergency staircase consist of a structure with guardrails in carbon steel, steel plate steps and a lower security door in steel tube, similar to the ladder structure.

The main platform has similar metallic tube guardrails.

References

Notes

Sources
 
 

Buildings and structures in Setúbal District
Buildings and structures in Almada
Individual elevators